Michael Fleming may refer to:

Michael Fleming (MP) (1668–1718), Member of Parliament for Westmorland 1707–1708
Sir Michael le Fleming, 4th Baronet (1748–1806), Member of Parliament for Westmorland
Michael Anthony Fleming (1792–1850), Bishop of Newfoundland
Michael P. Fleming (born 1963), Texas based lawyer
Michael Fleming (historian), professor of history at the Polish University Abroad in London
Michael Fleming (musician) (born 1935), American jazz bassist (:de:Michael Fleming)